Van Gisbergen is a surname. Notable people with the surname include:

 Mark Van Gisbergen (born 1977), New Zealand-born rugby union player
 Shane Van Gisbergen (born 1989), New Zealand racecar driver

Surnames of Dutch origin